Erkki Alvar Virtanen (born 15 August 1952 in Jämsänkoski) is a Finnish politician and member of Finnish Parliament, representing the Left Alliance. He was elected to the Finnish Parliament in the 2003 election.

External links
Parliament of Finland: Erkki Virtanen
Left Alliance: Erkki Virtanen 

1952 births
Living people
People from Jämsä
Left Alliance (Finland) politicians
Members of the Parliament of Finland (2003–07)
Members of the Parliament of Finland (2007–11)
Members of the Parliament of Finland (2011–15)